Avis Car Rental is an American car rental company headquartered in Parsippany, New Jersey. Avis, Budget Rent a Car, Budget Truck Rental and Zipcar are all units of Avis Budget Group.

Avis Budget Group operates the Avis brand in South Africa, North America, South America, India, Australia, and New Zealand. In 2011, Avis announced it was acquiring Avis Europe plc, which had been a separate corporation licensing the Avis brand.

Since the late 1970s, Avis has featured mainly General Motors (GM) vehicles such as Chevrolet and Cadillac, but today also rents popular non-GM brands including Ford and Toyota.

Avis is a rental car provider to the commercial segment serving business travelers at major airports internationally, and to leisure travellers at off-airport locations. Many of the off-airport locations are franchised operations rather than company-owned and -operated, as is the case with most airport locations. Avis was the first car rental business to be located at an airport.

In January 2013, the company agreed to acquire Zipcar for $491 million.

They are Main Jersey sponsor of Turkish Soccer Team, Fenerbahce SK.

History
The company was founded in 1946 with three cars at Willow Run Airport, Ypsilanti, Michigan, by Warren Avis (August 4, 1915 – April 24, 2007). It established branch operations across the United States over the next few years, becoming the second largest car rental company in the country by 1953. By its tenth anniversary in 1956 it had opened its first international offices in Europe, Canada and Mexico.

The Avis corporate motto of "We Try Harder" was adopted in 1962, during CEO Robert Townsend's tenure. The company aimed to put a positive spin on Avis' status as the second largest car rental company in the United States while also taking a shot at larger competitor The Hertz Corporation. The slogan was used for 50 years before a re-branding in 2012, when Avis unveiled a new slogan—"It's Your Space."

In 1972, Avis introduced Wizard, the first computer-based information and reservations system to be used in the United States car rental business; to this day, almost all frequent Avis customers are identified by their unique "Wizard number". In 1981, the company instituted its system of vehicle tracking, that was named Advanced Vehicle Identification System (AVIS).

Avis has been owned by a number of other companies over the years, along with several periods of being a public company. These include:
 1956: The Amoskeag Company
 1962: Investment group Lazard Freres
 1965: ITT Corporation
 1977: Norton Simon
 1983: Esmark
 1984: Beatrice Foods
 1986: Investment firm Wesray Capital Corporation
 1987: Majority ownership under an Employee Share Ownership Plan
 1989: General Motors (acquires 29% stake)
 1996: HFS Corporation
 2001: Cendant
 2006: Avis Budget Group

See also
 Colin Marshall, Baron Marshall of Knightsbridge, British peer and former CEO and COO.

References

Further reading

External links

 

1946 establishments in Michigan
American companies established in 1946
Avis Budget Group
Car rental companies of the United States
Companies based in Nassau County, New York
Franchises
Parsippany-Troy Hills, New Jersey
Retail companies established in 1946
Transport companies established in 1946